David Brewer is the name of:

David William Brewer (born 1940), Lord-Lieutenant of Greater London and Lord Mayor of London
David Josiah Brewer (1837–1910), Associate Justice of the United States Supreme Court
David L. Brewer III (born 1946), American school superintendent and retired Vice Admiral of the United States Navy
David M. Brewer (1959–2003), American convicted of murder
David V. Brewer (born 1951), Associate Justice of the Oregon Supreme Court

See also 
 John David Brewer (born 1951), English sociologist